Papiliolebias is a genus of fish in the family Rivulidae. These annual killifish are endemic to seasonal pools in the Paraguay and upper Madeira river basins in northwestern Argentina, central and southeastern Bolivia, and western Paraguay.

As typical of killifish, males are more colorful than females.

Species
Papiliolebias and the closely related Maratecoara, Pituna, Plesiolebias and Stenolebias form a clade, Plesiolebiasini.

There are currently 5 recognized species in Papiliolebias:

 Papiliolebias ashleyae D. T. B. Nielsen & Brousseau, 2014
 Papiliolebias bitteri (W. J. E. M. Costa, 1989)
 Papiliolebias francescae Valdesalici & Brousseau, 2014
 Papiliolebias habluetzeli Valdesalici, D. T. B. Nielsen, Brousseau & Phunkner, 2016
 Papiliolebias hatinne Azpelicueta, Butí & G. B. García, 2009

References

Rivulidae
Fish of South America
Freshwater fish genera